Ornipholidotos perfragilis is a butterfly in the family Lycaenidae. It is found in southern Cameroon, Equatorial Guinea, Gabon and the Republic of the Congo. The habitat consists of forests.

References

Butterflies described in 1890
Ornipholidotos
Butterflies of Africa